Hydrelia chionata is a moth in the family Geometridae. It is found in Iran.

References

Moths described in 1870
Asthenini
Moths of Asia